Mickey Donnelly may refer to:

Mickey Donnelly (footballer), for Cliftonville F.C.
Mickey Donnelly, musician in Spear of Destiny (band)

See also
Michael Donnelly (disambiguation)
Micky Donnelly, Northern Irish artist